The women's 3000 metre relay in short track speed skating at the 2002 Winter Olympics took place on 16 and 20 February at the Salt Lake Ice Center.

Records
Prior to this competition, the existing world and Olympic records were as follows:

The following new Olympic and world records were set during this competition.

Results

Semifinals
The semi-finals were held on 16 February. The top two teams in each semifinal qualified for the A final, while the third and fourth place teams advanced to the B Final.

Semifinal 1

Semifinal 2

Finals
The four qualifying teams competed in Final A, while four others raced in Final B.

Final A

Final B

References

Women's short track speed skating at the 2002 Winter Olympics
Women's events at the 2002 Winter Olympics